The Namibian Sports Commission (NSC) is the umbrella and regulatory organisation of all sport codes, based in Windhoek, the capital of Namibia. It is a governmental institution advising, and taking orders from, the Minister of Youth and Sport. It was established by the Government Gazette on 27 August 2003.

Sports Codes 
The Sports Commission is responsible (as of August 2020) for 49 recognised sports, which have been divided into three categories since 1 August 2018 and are therefore publicly funded in descending order:

 National sport codes: Soccer, Netball und Rugby
 Priority sports codes: Boxing,  Wrestling, Athletics und Paralympic Sports
 Development sports codes: amongst others Cricket

Duties 
The main tasks of the Namibian Sports Commission are:

 Management of the sport development fund
 Coordination, monitoring, development and support of sport
 Ensuring effective administration of national sports federations
 Promotion of Fair Play
 Securing access to sport for all social classes throughout Namibia
 Support for the development of sports products
 Approval of national and international sporting events
 Advisory function for the Ministry
 Organisation of further training in sport
 Support of national sports associations in the search for coaches
 Special projects after consultation with the Ministry
 Coordination of national sports federations
 Development, management and monitoring of sports facilities and equipment
 Awarding of the annual sports awards of the Republic of Namibia
 Monitoring compliance with the Sport Act by all national sports federations
 Surveillance of sporting events and persons who are not part of the NSC
 Support for national sports federations in the uniform organisation of activities and events

Structure 
The Namibian Sports Commission is headed by a chief administrator, currently Simataa Mwiya and a head of finance and administration. There are also nine members or commissioners in the Sports Commission, including chairperson Joel Matheus and deputy chairperson Alna Similo. All members are appointed by the Minister of Sport, Youth and National Service. Each committee member is assigned to a sports code.

Committees 
Part of the NSC administration is made up of five sports committees to which different tasks are assigned.

 National Colors (Colours Committee): Each national team of a recognised sports federation must wear the national sports symbols and colours determined by the Sports Commission. These include the sports emblem with a eagle and the wording „Namibia“.
 Development
 Audit and Finance
 Doping and Registration
 Executive Committee

References

Notes

Further reading

 Matheus breaks down sport commission budget - The Namibian
 Cabinet approves sports categorisation

Sports organisations of Namibia
2003 establishments in Namibia
Sport in Namibia
Sports governing bodies of Namibia